The Pakistan Women's One Day Cup, previously the PCB Triangular One Day Women's Tournament, is a women's domestic one-day cricket competition organised by the Pakistan Cricket Board. The tournament first took place in 2017–18, with three teams taking part: PCB Blasters, PCB Challengers and PCB Dynamites. In 2021–22, PCB Strikers joined the competition. The competition has run alongside the PCB Triangular Twenty20 Women's Tournament.

PCB Dynamites are the most successful side in the history of the competition, with 2 titles. The current holders are PCB Challengers, who won the 2021–22 tournament.

History
The tournament was established in 2017–18 as the PCB Triangular One Day Women's Tournament, effectively replacing the National Women's Cricket Championship. Three teams, PCB Blasters, PCB Challengers and PCB Dynamites, made up of the best players from across Pakistan, competed in a round-robin group across a week in February 2018 at Multan Cricket Stadium. Challengers and Dynamites progressed to the final, which Dynamites won by 190 runs, helped by centuries from Javeria Khan and Nida Dar.

PCB Dynamites also won the tournament the following season, 2018–19, beating PCB Blasters in the final. The tournament took place in December 2018, at State Bank of Pakistan Sports Complex, Karachi. In 2019–20, with the tournament taking place at Bagh-e-Jinnah, Lahore, PCB Blasters won their first title, beating PCB Challengers in the final by 6 runs.

After no tournament took place in 2020–21, the competition returned in 2021–22 as the Pakistan Women's One Day Cup, with a new team, PCB Strikers, competing for the first time. The tournament took place in September 2021 at the National Stadium and the Pakistan Cricket Board Academy Ground, both in Karachi. The tournament was won by PCB Challengers, who beat PCB Blasters in the final by 68 runs.

Teams

Results

See also
 PCB Triangular Twenty20 Women's Tournament
 Pakistan Cup

Notes

References

Pakistan Women's One Day Cup
Pakistani domestic cricket competitions
Women's cricket competitions in Pakistan
Recurring sporting events established in 2018
2018 establishments in Pakistan
Limited overs cricket